Australian official war artists are those who have been expressly employed by either the Australian War Memorial (AWM) or the Army Military History Section (or its antecedents). These artist soldiers depicted some aspect of war through art; this might be a pictorial record or it might commemorate how war shapes lives.

War artists have explored a visual and sensory dimension of war which is often absent in written histories or other accounts of warfare.  Official war artists have been appointed by governments for information or propaganda purposes and to record events on the battlefield; but there are many other types of war artist.

A war artist creates a visual account of war by showing its impact as men and women are shown waiting, preparing, fighting, suffering, celebrating,  The works produced by war artists illustrate and record many aspects of  war, and the individual's experience of war, whether allied or enemy, service or civilian, military or political, social or cultural. The rôle of the artist and his work embraces the causes, course and consequences of conflict and it has an essentially educational purpose.  For example, C.E.W. Bean's Anzac Book influenced the artists who grew up between the two world wars; and the war art of their childhoods provided a precedent and format for them to follow as war artists of the Second World War.

The AWM have appointed war artists to record the activities of Australian forces in Korea, Vietnam, East Timor and Afghanistan; and both the AWM and the Australian Army have appointed official war artists to depict Australian forces in Iraq.

First World War

The Australian tradition of war artists started with the First World War.

Will Dyson, an expatriate Australian artist living in London petitioned the Australian government to allow him to travel to the Western Front where Australian forces were fighting. In 1917 he was finally granted permission to accompany the Australian Imperial Force to record the activities of its soldiers and thus became the first Australian official war artist.

This early scheme was expanded upon and other Australian artists were commissioned to undertake forays to the front lines to record the Australian experience of war. Artists who had already enlisted and were fighting with the AIF, were appointed official war artists for the Australian Army.

Second World War
During the Second World War, the Australian War Memorial, continued the scheme and appointed war artists whilst the Australian Army, Royal Australian Navy and Royal Australian Air Force appointed their own official war artists from within their ranks.  Other venues have honored Australian participation in the war.

Selected artists

First World War
George Bell, 1878–1966.
George Courtney Benson, 1886–1960.
Frederick C. Britton, 1889–1931
Charles Bryant, 1883–1937.
George Coates
Frank R. Crozier, 1883–1948.
Will Dyson, 1880–1938.
A. Henry Fullwood, 1863–1930.
Charles Web Gilbert, 1867–1925.
John C. Goodchild 1898–1980
George Washington Lambert, 1873–1930.
 
Fred Leist,  1878–1945.
 Daryl Lindsay
John Longstaff, 1862–1941.
Will Longstaff, 1879–1953.
Louis Frederick McCubbin, 1890–1952.
W. B. McInnes
H. Septimus Power, 1877–1951.
James Quinn, 1869–1951.
James F. Scott 1877–1932.
Arthur Streeton, 1867–1943.
Charles Wheeler

Second World War

 Harold Abbott, 1906–1986.
Dennis Adams, 1914–2001.
Richard Ashton, 1913–2001.
George Allen, 1900–1972.
 Yosl Bergner, 1920–2017    .
 Stella Bowen, 1893–1947.
 Ernest Buckmaster, 1897–1968.
 Colin Colahan, 1897–1987.
Sybil Mary Frances Craig, 1901–1989
 William Dargie, 1912–2003.
 William Dobell, 1899–1970.
 Russell Drysdale, 1912–1981.
 Ray Ewers, 1917–1998.
 Harold Freedman, 1915–1999.
 Donald Friend, 1915–1989.
 John C. Goodchild, 1898–1980.
 Murray Griffin, 1903–1992.
 Henry Hanke, 1901–1989.
 Ivor Hele, 1912–1993.
 Sali Herman, 1898–1993.
 Nora Heysen, 1911–2003.
 Frank Hinder, 1906–1992.
 Ludwig Hirschfeld Mack, 1895–1965.
 Frank Hodgkinson AM, 1919–2001.
 Rex Julius, 1914–1944
 Geoffrey Mainwaring 1912–2000 
 Herbert McClintock, 1906–1985.
 Arthur Murch, 1902–1989.
 Alan Moore, 1914–2015
Thomas Maxwell Newton, 1919–1975.
 Sidney Nolan, 1917–1992.
 Frank Norton, 1916–1983.
 Tony Rafty, 1915–2015    .
Reginald Wilfred (Bill) Rowed 1916–1990
 Grace Cossington Smith, 1892–1984.
 Grace Taylor, 1897–1988.
 Ralph Walker, 1912–2003.

Recent conflicts
 Rick Amor, 1948–    , Peacekeeping in East Timor.
 Jon Cattapan, 1956–    , Peacekeeping in East Timor.
 Peter Churcher, 1964–    , War on Terrorism.
 George Gittoes AM, 1949–   .
 Shaun Gladwell, 1972–    , War in Afghanistan.
 Bruce Fletcher, 1937–    , Vietnam War
 Ivor Hele, 1912–1993, Korean War
 eX de Medici, 1959–    , Regional Assistance Mission to Solomon Islands
 Ken McFadyen, 1939–1997, Vietnam War
 Lewis Miller, 1959–     , War in Iraq.
 Frank Norton, 1916–1983, Korean War
 Wendy Sharpe, 1960–    , Peacekeeping in East Timor
 Conway Bown, 1966–    , Australian Army War Artist, RAAF War artist, War in Iraq and War in Afghanistan and War on Terrorism.

See also
 War artists
 Military art
 War photography
 American official war artists
 British official war artists
 New Zealand official war artists

Notes

References 
 McCloskey, Barbara. (2005).  Artists of World War II. Westport: Greenwood Press. ;  OCLC 475496457
 Reid, John B. (1977). Australian Artists at War: Compiled from the Australian War Memorial Collection. Volume 1. 1885–1925; Vol. 2 1940–1970.  South Melbourne, Victoria: Sun Books. ;   OCLC 4035199

Further reading
 Gallatin, Albert Eugene. Art and the Great War. (New York: E.P. Dutton, 1919).

External links
 Hutchison, Margaret: Art (Australia), in: 1914-1918-online International Encyclopedia of the First World War.